Firuz Bahram may refer to:

Firuzbahram
Firuzbahram Rural District
Firuz Bahram High School